Euobrimus cavernosus is a representative of the stick insects native to the Philippines. It is considered one of the largest species in the subfamily Obriminae.

Taxonomy 
The species was described in 1877 by Carl Stål under the basionym Obrimus cavernosus in the genus Obrimus, which had also been set up by Stål two years earlier. He calls them closely related to Obrimus bufo and distinguishes them from the latter by the slightly different spines on the body and legs. The main difference is the lateral pits in the metasternum, which also give the species its name ("cavernousus" Latin for cave-like). In 1933, Sjöstedt mentioned the female presumably used for the first description as a holotype. It is in the Swedish Museum of Natural History in Stockholm. In 1906, Joseph Redtenbacher examined specimens of the species from the Natural History Museum, Berlin and the National Museum of Natural History, France in  Paris. Among other things, the male of the species is described, mentioning the possibility that both sexes do not belong to the same species. Rethenbacher also describes another species with metasternal pits under the name Obrimus lacerta (now Euobrimus lacerta). This is smaller and, according to Redtenbacher, differs in the female sex by the larger, but flatter, four spines on the basal segments of the abdomen, which are also present in Obrimus cavernosus. In addition, Obrimus lacerta lacks the four spines on the posterior edge of these abdominal segments. James Abram Garfield Rehn and his son John William Holman Rehn described both the genus Brasidas and Euobrimus in 1939. They transferred both Obrimus cavernosus and Obrimus lacerta to the latter. Regarding Euobrimus cavernosus, they mention confusion in part by Redtenbacher and Carl August Dohrn. Four of the six specimens they studied, four of which were male and two female, are from Morgan Hebard's collection. This is deposited in the Natural History Museum at Drexel University in Philadelphia. The other two specimens, two males, are from the collection of what is now the National Museum of Natural History in Washington, D.C..

In a molecular genetic study published in 2021, several species of the genera Brasidas and Euobrimus were examined, including samples of Euobrimus cavernosus from different localities. While most of the Obrimini genera have been confirmed as monophyletic, there is some uncertainty about Brasidas and Euobrimus.

Description 

The females of the species reach  in length and are therefore among the largest representatives of the obrimini along with Trachyaretaon carmelae. Like many other species of the tribe, they are very variably colored. In addition to females with a light or dark brown base color, there are also green and mixed colored animals. The small, black tubercles, which are often typical for representatives of the genus, are particularly present in the area of the meso- and metanotum. In addition, larger areas of white or beige are often present, such as a line beginning on the pronotum and extending to the abdomen, or symmetrical areas on the metanotum. Darker or almost black patterns can also appear, especially on the abdomen. The larger spines on the head, thorax, and anterior abdomen may be dark or green in color. The abdomen ends in an ovipositor. Its ventral subgenital plate ends in a point. The dorsal part of the ovipositor, which is called the supraanal plate or epiproct, is significantly shorter than the ventral part and ends bluntly.

The body, which is olive green to brown on the upper side, is conspicuously reddish brown in the area of the mesonotum. The beige to yellowish longitudinal line from the pronotum to the front abdomen, which also occurs in some females, is always more or less clearly present. The males have significantly fewer spines than the females. In addition to three pairs of spines on the head, there is only one larger pair of spines in the rear area of the pro-, meso- and metanotum. In addition, a larger pair of mesopleurals and several metapleural spines are formed.

Distribution area and reproduction 

While Stål only gives the distribution area as the Philippines, Redtenbacher names both Luzon for the specimen from the Berlin museum and Mindanao for the one from the Paris museum. Rehn and Rehn also name Mindanao, more precisely Surigao del Norte and the offshore island of Siargao, as a distribution area, but exclude Luzon. In the case of Sarah Bank et al. examined samples of the species, on the other hand, are animals from Luzon, more precisely from the south-eastern province of Sorsogon from Mount Pulog (not to be confused with Mount Pulag in northern Luzon), and from the offshore island of Rapu Rapu.

Their operculum (cover) is flat and sits slightly obliquely on the egg.

In terraristics 

In October 2011, the Frenchman Thierry Heitzmann, who lives in the Philippines, collected four pairs of this species on the island of Rapu-Rapu. The very large animals were initially classified as Brasidas sp. 'Rapu-Rapu'. After the animals did not eat well and three of the four pairs died, the fourth female laid enough eggs to be able to send some to Europe. In 2012, the Swiss Philipp Heller managed to hatch some animals, raise them successfully and pass them on. The species received the PSG number 362 from the Phasmid Study Group and is still known there as Brasidas sp. 'Rapu-Rapu'.

Another stock was also collected by Heitzmann on Luzon in the province of Sorsogon at Mount Pulog before the summer of 2011. From the animals identified by Joachim Bresseel as Euobrimus lacerta, he sent some eggs to the Dutchman Rob Krijns, who successfully bred them and distributed the offspring in Europe. The resulting breeding line is listed by the Phasmid Study Group under the PSG number 377 and the name Euobrimus lacerta used by Heitzmann. According to the recent study by Bank et al., in which Bresseel also participated, this stock is also Euobrimus cavernosus.

Keeping the stocks currently being bred is uncomplicated. Unlike Heitzmann's original animals of Rapu Rapu, they readily eat a variety of forage plants. Hazel, salal, Araceae, bramble and other Rosaceae are suitable as food for all stages.

Gallery

References

External links

Phasmatodea
Phasmatodea of Asia
Insects described in 1939